John Ernest Crawford (March 26, 1946 – April 29, 2021) was an American actor, singer, and musician. He first performed before a national audience as a Mouseketeer. At age 12, Crawford rose to prominence playing Mark McCain in the series The Rifleman, for which he was nominated for a Best Supporting Actor Emmy Award at age 13.

Crawford had a brief career as a recording artist in the 1950s and 1960s. He continued to act on television and in film as an adult. Beginning in 1992, Crawford led the California-based Johnny Crawford Orchestra, a vintage dance orchestra that performed at special events.

Early life
Crawford was born in Los Angeles, California, United States, the son of Betty (née Megerlin) and Robert Lawrence Crawford Sr. His maternal grandparents were Belgian; his maternal grandfather was violinist Alfred Eugene Megerlin. In 1959, Johnny, his older brother Robert L. Crawford Jr., a co-star of the series Laramie, and their father Robert Sr. were all nominated for Emmy Awards (the brothers for acting, and their father for film editing). He was of Russian-Jewish, German, and English ancestry.

Career
Crawford began his career as a child actor. One of The Walt Disney Company's original Mouseketeers in 1955, he acted on stage, in films, and on television.

Disney started out with 24 original Mouseketeers, but at the end of the first season, the studio reduced the number to 12, and Crawford was cut. His first important break as an actor followed with the title role in a Lux Video Theatre production of "Little Boy Lost", a live broadcast on March 15, 1956. He also appeared in the popular Western series The Lone Ranger in 1956 in one of the few color episodes of that series. Following that performance, the young actor worked steadily with many seasoned actors and directors. Freelancing for two and one-half years, he accumulated almost 60 television credits, including featured roles in three episodes of NBC's The Loretta Young Show and an appearance as Manuel in "I Am an American", an episode of the crime drama The Sheriff of Cochise. He starred in the 1958 Season 1 finale of The Restless Gun.  He starred as Bobby Adams in the 1958 drama Courage of Black Beauty. He appeared as Tommy Peel in the 1958 episode "The Dealer" in Tales of Wells Fargo. By the spring of 1958, he had performed 14 demanding roles in live teleplays for NBC Matinee Theatre, appeared on CBS's sitcom Mr. Adams and Eve, in the Wagon Train episode "The Sally Potter Story", and on the syndicated series Crossroads, The Sheriff of Cochise, and Whirlybirds, and made three pilots of television series. The third pilot, made as an episode of Dick Powell's Zane Grey Theatre, was picked up by ABC, and the first season of The Rifleman began filming in July 1958.

Crawford was nominated for an Emmy Award as Best Supporting Actor in 1959, at age 13. He received the nomination for his role as Mark McCain (the son of Lucas McCain, played by Chuck Connors) in The Rifleman. Crawford also played a young boy named Clay Holden, who befriends Connors in a 1965 episode of Branded. Connors and Crawford were close friends when Connors died on November 10, 1992, and Crawford gave a eulogy at Connors' memorial.

During the late 1950s and early 1960s, Crawford had wide popularity with American teenagers and a recording career on Del-Fi Records that generated four Billboard Top 40 hits, including the single "Cindy's Birthday", which peaked at number eight in 1962. His other hits included "Rumors" (number 12, 1962), "Your Nose Is Gonna Grow" (number 14, 1962), and "Proud" (number 29, 1963).

Late in 1961, Crawford appeared as Victor in the episode "A Very Bright Boy" on The Donna Reed Show. His brother Robert had been a guest star on The Donna Reed Show. In 1964 and in 1965, Crawford appeared on the NBC education drama Mr. Novak playing JoJo Rizzo.

Crawford played Jeff, Wilbur's neighbor in Mister Ed, who was more interested in pop music than his algebra.

Among his films, Crawford played an American Indian in the unique adventure film Indian Paint (1965). He played a character involved with a disturbed young girl played by Kim Darby in The Restless Ones (1965), and played a character shot by John Wayne's character in El Dorado (1966). He played young deputy Billy Norris in The Big Valley episode "The Other Face of Justice" in 1969.

While enlisted in the United States Army for two years, Crawford worked on training films as a production coordinator, assistant director, script supervisor, and occasional actor. His rank was sergeant at the time of his honorable discharge in December 1967.

In 1968, Crawford played a soldier wanted for murder in "By the Numbers", an episode of the television series Hawaii Five-O.

The Resurrection of Broncho Billy was a student film Crawford agreed to do as a favor to his close friend, producer John Longenecker. It won the 1970 Academy Award for Best Live Action Short Subject.

The Naked Ape was a partially animated 1973 feature film starring Crawford and Victoria Principal, produced by Hugh Hefner.

In 1976, Crawford co-starred as Ben Shelby in the 10th episode of season three of Little House on the Prairie, "The Hunters".

Crawford appeared as Deputy Noah Paisley in a 1985 episode of Murder, She Wrote.

Crawford played a key role in the early career of entertainer Victoria Jackson of Saturday Night Live fame. After the two appeared together in a summer stock production of Meet Me in St. Louis, he presented her with a one-way ticket to California and encouraged her to pursue a career in Hollywood. This led Jackson to early appearances on The Tonight Show Starring Johnny Carson, then she was cast as a regular on SNL.

His final role in a film was playing William S. Hart in the 2019 Western Bill Tilghman and the Outlaws. 

Beginning in 1992, Crawford led a California-based vintage dance orchestra, which performed at special events. The formal name of the band was JCO (Johnny Crawford Orchestra). The JCO logo appeared on Crawford's drums when the band played in Las Vegas, Nevada. The band has been sponsored by the Playboy Jazz Festival, and the orchestra has been the choice for 15 consecutive annual Art Directors Guild Awards shows at The Beverly Hilton in Beverly Hills, California. A remastered version of the orchestra's highly rated first album, Sweepin' the Clouds Away, was released on August 21, 2012, on the label CD Baby.

Personal life and death
Crawford reconnected with Charlotte Samco, his high school sweetheart, in 1990, and they married in 1995.

In 2019, MeTV reported that Crawford had been diagnosed with Alzheimer's disease. His longtime friend, actor Paul Petersen, started a GoFundMe fundraiser to help cover Crawford's medical costs. Crawford died in a personal care home on April 29, 2021, at age 75, after contracting COVID-19 and pneumonia before later succumbing to Alzheimer's disease.

Singles 

 AAlso peaked at #2 in Billboard Adult Contemporary charts.

References

External links
 Official website

 The Rifleman: Johnny Crawford
 Broncho Billy short film
 Johnny Crawford's MySpace site 
 

1946 births
2021 deaths
American male child actors
American male film actors
American male pop singers
American male television actors
American people of Belgian descent
Mouseketeers
Male actors from Los Angeles
20th-century American male actors
Del-Fi Records artists
Deaths from the COVID-19 pandemic in California
Deaths from pneumonia in California